Villa Carminati-Ferrario is a building located in Monza, Italy, in piazza Citterio.  It was built in 1830 and designed by the architect Pietro Pestagalli, in late neoclassical style.

The layout of the villa is u-shaped, centered on an internal courtyard, which reflects the architectural taste of Bourgeois families at the time.  A small garden with two palm trees is located at the front of the building facing piazza Citterio.

The facade is symmetrical and decorated with reliefs by Girolamo Rusca depicting the four seasons.

Buildings and structures in Monza
Houses completed in 1830
Neoclassical architecture in Lombardy
Carminati Ferrario
1830 establishments in the Austrian Empire